Tsukasa Dokite (土器手 司), is a Japanese animator and character designer. He is perhaps best known for his work on various anime during the 1980s, the Dirty Pair series in particular.

Filmography 
 Plawres Sanshiro (1983-1984)
 Srungle (1983)
 Giant Gorg (1984) Animation Director (episodes 15, 21, 23), Key Animation
 Urusei Yatsura 3: Remember My Love (1985) Animation Director
 Dirty Pair (1985-1986) Character Design, Animation Director (episodes 1, 5, 8, 12, 23)
 Urusei Yatsura 4: Lum the Forever (1986) Animation Director
 Project A-ko (1986) Key Animation
 Dirty Pair: Project Eden (1986) Character Design, Animation Director
 Maison Ikkoku: Through the Passing of the Seasons (1988) Animation Director
 Gude Crest (1990) Character Design
 Gasaraki (1998-1999) Storyboard (ED1), Unit Director (ED1), Animation Director (ED1), Ending Animation Director, Ending Animation Storyboards, Ending Key Animation, Key Animation (ED1)

External links 
Studio Jipangu - Tsukasa Dokite's official website (Japanese)

Sunrise (company) people
Japanese animators
Anime character designers
Living people
Year of birth missing (living people)